Daniel Zaitsev (born 13 December 1997) is an Estonian butterfly and freestyle swimmer. He competed in the men's 50 metre butterfly event at the 2017 World Aquatics Championships. He is a 18-time long course and 26-time short course Estonian swimming champion. He has broken 27 Estonian records in swimming.

See also
 List of Estonian records in swimming

References

External links
 
 Daniel Zaitsev at ESBL

1997 births
Living people
Estonian male freestyle swimmers
Swimmers from Tallinn
Swimmers at the 2014 Summer Youth Olympics
Swimmers at the 2015 European Games
European Games competitors for Estonia
Estonian male butterfly swimmers
21st-century Estonian people